Peter Simon (born September 27, 1943 in New York City, New York) is an American actor.

Early career 

Simon began his career studying acting at the Phillips Exeter Academy. He attended Williams College in Williamstown, MA. Simon subsequently became a member of the professional repertory theater company at Purdue University, and also spent a season at the Barn Theater in Michigan

Television 

Simon's best known work has been as an actor in daytime soap operas. After having appeared on The Edge of Night, his next role was as Scott Phillips on Search for Tomorrow (1969 to 1979). He left Search For Tomorrow and was replaced by actor Peter Ratray. He then appeared as Ian MacFarland on As the World Turns in 1979. In 1981, he began playing his most high-profile daytime role as Dr. Ed Bauer on the long-running soap opera Guiding Light. He played the role from 1981 to 1984, then returned for a second run from 1986 to 1996.

After several attempts to woo Simon back, Guiding Light convinced Simon to return to the show for a third run in 2002.  However, Simon publicly expressed disapproval during a controversial storyline that unfolded in 2003 and 2004. The storyline (regarding mysterious characters Maryanne and Carrie Carruthers) received criticism for revising past show history, and drew disdain from Simon in the press regarding a particular scene where it was written that Ed had to strike his daughter. Simon left the show again in 2004. 

Simon made a final return to Guiding Light along with the actors that played his daughter Michelle Bauer Santos (Nancy St. Alban) and son-in-law Danny Santos (Paul Anthony Stewart), in June 2009, appearing several times prior to the show's final episodes in September 2009.

Theater 

Simon has done theater work as an actor and a playwright. His play, Sabbat, received its world premiere at his alma mater, Williams College, in 1968, directed by Keith Fowler, who was then a Williams faculty member.  Among his New York theater appearances are roles in productions of P.S. Your Cat Is Dead off-Broadway, as well as a New York Shakespeare Festival production of "Twelfth Night".

Personal life 
Simon's first marriage to Merle Louise, with whom he had three children, ended in divorce. He married Search for Tomorrow co-star Courtney Simon in 1975, and the couple share five children (some from prior marriages, as well as one born to the couple, Kate Hall, who is a daytime soap writer just like her mother).

External links

Peter Simon profile

American male television actors
American male stage actors
American male soap opera actors
1943 births
Living people
Phillips Exeter Academy alumni